Tombs of Ustad – Shagird are Mughal period monuments situated in village Talania of Sirhind-Fategarh, Punjab, India. Sirhind was a popular town during Mughal period. It was situated on the Delhi to Lahore Highway. In 1710, Banda Singh Bahadur and his Sikh army destroyed the city of Sirhind completely and Wazir Khan the governor, was killed in the Battle of Chappar Chiri. But some of these monuments like Tombs of Ustad – Shagird survived.

History
Tombs of Ustad – Shagird, are historical buildings built in memory of Ustad Syad Khan who was a great architect and builder of that period. The tomb of shagird is built as a memorial to Khawaja Khan who also was a well known architect. In Hindi and Urdu, Ustad means teacher and Shagird means student. In this case Ustad Syad Khan was the teacher of Khawaja Khan that is why these tombs are known as Tombs of Ustad – Shagird or Ustad Di Mazar Shahgird Di Mazar in local language.

Features
These monuments are at a distance of 2.5 kilometers from Rauza Sharif another well known monuments of the area.

Gallery

References

External links
 

Monuments and memorials in Punjab, India
Mughal tombs
Fatehgarh Sahib district
Tourism in Punjab, India